Miami Valley Hospital (MVH) is a large urban hospital in Dayton, Ohio, and is a member of the Premier Health Partners network. The hospital has two additional locations; Miami Valley Hospital South in Centerville, Ohio, and Miami Valley Hospital North in Englewood, Ohio. It has the Dayton region's only Level I Trauma Center, a regional adult burn center, and a level 3 neonatal intensive care unit. Miami Valley Hospital has 7,370 employees and 970 beds, and saw over 400,000 outpatient visits in 2007. Miami Valley Hospital's emergency and trauma center contains 72 beds and is the busiest emergency department in Ohio. Miami Valley Hospital also operates three air ambulances known as CareFlight. Miami Valley Hospital is a top 100 hospital in the United States for clinical excellence. The hospital also holds numerous awards from HealthGrades, Forbes, and U.S. News & World Report. The Boonshoft School of Medicine at Wright State University is the affiliated university.

History
Miami Valley Hospital opened as the Protestant Deaconess Hospital in 1890. In 1895, the hospital treated patients for an average cost of 74 cents per patient per day. The hospital charged five dollars a week for a private room and whatever the patient could afford in the public wards. Dayton's first emergency room was opened beneath the main surgery floor in 1912. MVH also established outpatient clinic in 1913 in response to the aftermath of the 1913 flood. From the 1920s to the 1950s, the hospital saw the most advancements in expansion and additions. As the hospital made advancements in care, in 1952, MVH opened the Radioisotope Laboratory, a forerunner to nuclear medicine. MVH was the first non-university hospital in Ohio to be authorized by the Atomic Energy Commission to use radioactive materials in research and patient care. In 1983, MVH's first air ambulance, CareFlight, was put into service, which made rapid emergency transport available within a  radius. By its second year, CareFlight was averaging more than one transport every day. CareFlight operates four helicopters, based at the hospital main campus in Dayton, Lebanon-Warren County Airport, and Grimes Field in Urbana, Ohio, and Darke County Airport in Versailles, Ohio.

In 2010, the Neurological Institute at Miami Valley Hospital was established. The neurological institute is in partnership with Premier Health Partners and Wright State University. The Center focuses on the treatment, diagnosis, and research of neurological disorders.

On the June 2nd, 2022, a shooting occurred at the hospital, when Brian Booth, a 30-year old inmate at the county jail, fatally shot Darrell Holderman, a 78-year old security guard. Booth then reportedly pointed his gun at others in the hospital, before shooting himself dead in the parking lot.

Awards and recognition
Miami Valley Hospital has received the following:

2012:
 Distinguished Hospital Award for Clinical Excellence
 Emergency Medicine Excellence Award
 Cardiac Care Excellence Award and top 100 in the United States for Cardiac Care
 Cardiac Surgery Excellence Award and top 100 in the United States for Cardiac Surgery
 Pulmonary Care Excellence Award
 Critical Care Excellence Award and top 100 in the United States for Critical Care
 U.S. News & World Report #2 best hospital in the Dayton region.
 American Association of Critical-Care Nurses awarded the Beacon Award to the Heart & Vascular Intensive Care

2011:
 Distinguished Hospital Award for Clinical Excellence
 Women's Health Excellence Award also Five-Star Rated in Women's Health
 Pulmonary Care Excellence Award
 Emergency Medicine Excellence Award
 Cardiac Care Excellence Award 

2010:
 2010 Press Ganey Summit Award
 Emergency Medicine Excellence Award
 Distinguished Hospital for Clinical Excellence
 Cardiac Care Excellence Award
 Coronary Intervention Excellence Award
 Critical Care Excellence Award
 Pulmonary Care Excellence Award
 Women's Health Excellence

2009:
 One of America's safest hospitals by Forbes
 Distinguished Hospital for Clinical Excellence
 Women's Health Excellence Award
 Cardiac Care Excellence Award
 Coronary Intervention Excellence Award
 Critical Care Excellence Award
 Pulmonary Care Excellence Award
 Stroke Care Excellence Award
 Earned the National Organ Donation Medal of Honor for Transplant Services for achieving outstanding organ donation and conversion rates by the U.S. Department of Health and Human Services (HHS).
 In 2009, a Study Ranked Miami Valley Hospital #1 in Southwest Ohio For Overall Cardiac Services.

2008:
 Distinguished Hospital Award for Clinical Excellence
 Intervention Excellence Award
 Stroke Care Excellence Award
 HealthGrades ranked Miami Valley Hospital's cardiac program among the top five hospitals in Ohio and top 50 in the United States for overall cardiac services, cardiology services and coronary interventional procedures.
 One of America's Best Hospitals Distinction in Orthopedics by U.S. News & World Report.
 Ranked #49 in the nation for orthopedic care by U.S. News & World Report.

2007:
 Level I Trauma Verification
 Bariatric Surgery Center of Excellence by the American Society for Bariatric Surgery (ASBS)
 Commission on Cancer Award
 Stroke Care Excellence Award
 Distinguished Hospital Award for Clinical Excellence
 HealthGrades Rated #1 in Ohio for spine and neck Surgery
 National Research Corporation Consumer Choice Award 1996-2007
 U.S. News & World Report ranked MVH as one of America's best hospitals
 Ranked among the top five percent of the nation's hospitals for quality by HealthGrades
 In June 2007, MVH was recognized by the Centers for Medicare and Medicaid Services (CMS) as one of only 38 hospitals in the nation and the only hospital in southwest Ohio to be rated better than the national average for heart failure death rates.

CareFlight Air and Mobile Services
The CareFlight program serves over 150 hospitals and over 300 community fire departments, and police departments in 17 counties. Since its inception on October 6, 1983, CareFlight has made over 25,000 flights. In addition to 4 Eurocopter Dauphin helicopters, CareFlight includes 5 ambulances, called Mobile Intensive Care Units (MICUs) for ground transport. The MICUs(mobile intensive care unit) cover a  radius from MVH, and CareFlight air ambulances serve a  radius. This includes most of Ohio and parts of West Virginia, Michigan, Kentucky, and Indiana.

Locations
Other hospitals within the Premier Health Partners network are Atrium Medical Center in Warren County, Upper Valley Medical Center in Miami County, Miami Valley Hospital North in Englewood, Ohio, and Miami Valley Hospital South in Centerville, Ohio.

Recent developments
The tower focuses on cardiac and orthopedic care. The expansion allowed for 98 percent of the hospital to contain all private patient rooms and for the hospital itself to grow to almost .

See also
 List of hospitals in Ohio
 List of hospitals in the United States

References

External links
 Miami Valley Hospital

Hospitals in Dayton, Ohio
Teaching hospitals in Ohio
Hospitals established in 1890
1890 establishments in Ohio
Trauma centers